Aulus Verginius Tricostus Rutilus was a Roman consul in 476 BC.  

Following their defeat of the Roman army at the Battle of the Cremera in 477 BC, the Veientes marched on Rome and occupied the Janiculum. There they remained at the beginning of Verginius' consulship.  Both consuls, Verginius and his colleague Spurius Servilius, remained in Rome to deal with the threat.

The Veientes marched from the Janiculum and crossed the Tiber, and assaulted the camp of Servilius.  His force successfully repulsed the Veientes, who retreated to the Janiculum. The following morning Servilius' army took position at the foot of the Janiculum, and marched up the slope to attack the enemy. The battle went badly for the Romans, until a force led by Verginius attacked the Veientes from the rear, whereupon the Veientes were cut off and soundly defeated.

References

5th-century BC Roman consuls
Tricostus Rutilus, Aulus Verginius